Hexyl acetate is an ester with the molecular formula C8H16O2.  It is mainly used as a solvent for resins, polymers, fats and oils. It is also used as a paint additive to improve its dispersion on a surface.

Hexyl acetate is also used as a flavoring because of its fruity odor, and it is naturally present in many fruits (such as apples and plums) as well as alcoholic beverages.

References

Acetate esters
Ester solvents
Sweet-smelling chemicals